Bhopatpur is a village in Kaushambi district, Uttar Pradesh, India.

References

Villages in Kaushambi district